Aviamotornaya may refer to:

 Aviamotornaya (Kalininsko-Solntsevskaya line)
 Aviamotornaya (Bolshaya Koltsevaya line)